MegaRace 2 is a vehicular combat racing game developed by Cryo in 1996, for the PC. It was published by Mindscape and is the first sequel of the original MegaRace, which was later followed by MegaRace 3.

This game features host Lance Boyle (Christian Erickson), joined by his assistant Lucinda (Alice Evans). The player is an "enforcer", attempting to win a series of races against computer opponents, by finishing in first place, or destroying their cars, automatically disqualifying them.

Microïds, owners of the Cryo brand, made the game available on GOG.com on April 30, 2009 alongside the first MegaRace. It also received a version for OS X on June 18, 2013 via GOG.com. It is now also available on Steam.

Reception

References

External links 
 MegaRace 2 at MobyGames
 MegaRace 2 at GameSpot.com

1996 video games
Cryo Interactive games
Science fiction racing games
DOS games
DOS-only games
Full motion video based games
Video games developed in France
Video games with pre-rendered 3D graphics
Mindscape games